Acer is a village in the Oğuzeli District, Gaziantep Province, Turkey. The village is inhabited by Turkmens of the Elbegli tribe.

References

Villages in Oğuzeli District